The Sheriff is an album by American jazz group the Modern Jazz Quartet featuring performances recorded in 1963 and released on the Atlantic label.

Reception
The AllMusic review stated: "The Sheriff features the Modern Jazz Quartet in fine swinging form. The program is not as sharply focused as on some of the earlier Atlantic releases, but it is compelling nonetheless".

Track listing
All compositions by John Lewis, except as indicated
 "The Sheriff" - 2:41 
 "In a Crowd" - 3:05 
 "Bachianas Brasileiras" (Heitor Villa-Lobos) - 5:44 
 "Mean to Me" (Fred E. Ahlert, Roy Turk) - 4:24 
 "Natural Affection" - 4:08 
 "Donnie's Theme" - 4:13 
 "Manhã de Carnaval" (Luiz Bonfá) - 6:06

Personnel
Milt Jackson - vibraphone
John Lewis - piano
Percy Heath - bass
Connie Kay - drums
Nesuhi Ertegun - producer
Tom Dowd - recording engineer
Stanisław Zagórski - cover art

References

1964 albums
Atlantic Records albums
Modern Jazz Quartet albums
Albums produced by Nesuhi Ertegun